Weißenfels (often written in English as Weissenfels) is the largest town of the Burgenlandkreis district, in southern Saxony-Anhalt, central Germany.

History

Perhaps the first mention of the area, before the town itself was founded occurred in 806 CE, when Charles the Younger (Karl der Jüngere), King of the Franks, fought and killed two West Slavic  Knezy (princes) nearby:  duke Miliduch of the Sorbs and Nessyta (possibly also a Sorbian leader). Miliduch had led a Sorbian invasion of Austrasia.

The settlement arose around a castle on a ford crossing the Saale and received municipal rights in 1185. During the Thirty Years' War, the town was badly damaged and the population fell from 2200 to 960. On 7 November 1632 the body of King Gustavus Adolphus of Sweden was first laid out at Weißenfels after he had been killed the day before at the Battle of Lützen.

Shortly afterwards however, the town took a steep rise in importance, when Duke Augustus, a scion of the Saxon House of Wettin, established the Duchy of Saxe-Weissenfels in 1656 and chose Weißenfels as his residence and as the capital of the duchy. Since 1638 Augustus had served as the Protestant administrator of the Magdeburg archbishopric, which, according to the 1648 Peace of Westphalia would be finally secularised to Brandenburg-Prussia upon his death.

Augustus therefore from 1660 onward erected the Baroque Neu-Augustusburg Castle on a hill in Weißenfels as the seat of his ducal successors. Completed in 1680 it became the duchy's administrative as well as cultural centre until its dissolution in 1746. Composers like Johann Philipp Krieger and Georg Philipp Telemann worked here, the actress Friederike Caroline Neuber made her first appearances at Weißenfels. In 1702 Johann Sebastian Bach's application for the position of the organist in Sangerhausen (belonging to Weißenfels) failed, because the Duke of Saxe-Weissenfels preferred the—rediscovered in 2010—composer Johann Augustin Kobelius. In 1713 Johann Sebastian Bach dedicated his cantata Was mir behagt, ist nur die muntre Jagd, BWV 208 to Duke Christian of Saxe-Weissenfels.

The Lutheran theologian Erdmann Neumeister from 1704 on served as a deacon at the ducal palace's Trinity Chapel. Its pipe organ completed in 1673 has 22 stops. According to John Mainwaring, Duke Johann Adolf I of Saxe-Weissenfels himself discovered the musical talent of George Frideric Handel, when he heard the son of his physician Georg Händel playing on the organ. Bach wrote the Toccata and Fugue in F major (BWV 540) for it.

With the extinction of the Wettin Saxe-Weissenfels line in 1746, the town fell back to the Saxon Electorate and after the 1815 Congress of Vienna to the Prussian Province of Saxony. From 1816 on it was the capital of the Weißenfels district until its dissolution in 2007.

Population
Development of the town's population (from 1960 as at 31 December):

Datasource since 1990: Statistical office of Saxony-Anhalt
1: 29 October
2: 31 August
3: 3 October

Incorporations

On 1 January 1995 Weißenfels absorbed the former municipality Borau. Since an administrative reform on 1 January 2010, Weißenfels also comprises the former municipalities of Langendorf, Markwerben and Uichteritz. On 1 September 2010, the former municipalities of Burgwerben, Großkorbetha, Leißling, Reichardtswerben, Schkortleben, Storkau, Tagewerben and Wengelsdorf joined the town. These 12 former municipalities are now Ortschaften or municipal divisions of Weißenfels.

Politics

Seats in the municipal council (Stadtrat) as of 2014 elections:

Economy
Since the 19th century industrialisation, shoe manufacture was Weißenfels' primary industry, until 1991 when the last factory shut down. Since then, the food processing industry has grown significantly. The main companies are:
 Frischli dairy 
 Tönnies Fleischwerk, Europe's third biggest meat group, runs one of its three meat-processing plants in Weißenfels
 Mitteldeutsche Erfrischungsgetränke, the third largest mineral water company of Germany, has its seat in Weißenfels. Its brands include Leißlinger Mineralwasser and Saskia-Quelle''.

The town has access to the A9 at the Weißenfels junction, near the interchange with the A38. Weißenfels station is a stop on the Thuringian Railway line from Halle to Erfurt/Jena.

Sports
Basketball and Unihockey are the two most popular sports in town. Mitteldeutscher Basketball Club (MBC) was playing in the German national basketball league in between 1999 and 2004 and entered the league again in 2009. Unihockey Club Kreissparkasse Weißenfels won the German Unihockey championship seven times, from 2003 to 2009. The Unihockey European Cup, organized every year in order to establish the best team in Europe, was held in Weißenfels and neighbouring cities Hohenmölsen and Merseburg in January 2004.

Notable people

Heinrich Schütz (1585–1672), composer and organist
Gottfried Reiche (1667–1734), trumpeter
Johann Adolf II, Duke of Saxe-Weissenfels (1685–1747), Duke of Saxe-Weissenfels
Joachim Wilhelm von Brawe (1738–1758), playwright
Novalis, pen name of poet Friedrich von Hardenberg (1772–1801)
Louise von François (1817–1893), writer
Heinrich von Gossler (1841-1927), general
Willy Kükenthal (1861–1922), zoologist
Georg Kükenthal (1864–1955), botanist
Horst P. Horst (1906–1999), photographer
Benjamin Halevy (1910–1996), Israeli judge and politician
Konrad Dannenberg (1912–2009), rocket scientist
Johanna Elisabeth Döbricht (1692—1786), operatic soprano
Hermann Eilts (1922–2006), diplomat and adviser to Kissinger on Mideast
Gérard Tichy (1920–1992), Spanish actor
Max Frankel (born 1930), American journalist, Editor in Chief of the New York Times
Theresa Emilie Henriette Winkel (1784–1867), composer

Twin towns – sister cities

Weißenfels is twinned with:
 Kornwestheim, Germany (1990)
 Komárno, Slovakia (1995)

See also

 Saale-Unstrut wine region

References

 
Burgenlandkreis
Burial sites of the House of Leiningen